Oubachu is one of 54 parish councils in Cangas del Narcea, a municipality within the province and autonomous community of Asturias, in northern Spain.

Villages
 Oubachu
 Tablizas
 La Veiga'l Tachu

References

Parishes in Cangas del Narcea